Dendy's toadlet (Pseudophryne dendyi) is a species of frog in the family Myobatrachidae.
It is endemic to Australia.
Its natural habitats are temperate forests, temperate grassland, rivers, intermittent rivers, swamps, and intermittent freshwater marshes.

References

Pseudophryne
Amphibians of New South Wales
Amphibians of Victoria (Australia)
Taxonomy articles created by Polbot
Amphibians described in 1892
Frogs of Australia